Robert J. Gilliard, Jr. is an American chemist and researcher who is the Novartis Associate Professor of Chemistry at Massachusetts Institute of Technology. His research involves the synthesis of molecules for energy storage, molecular materials, and main-group element mediated bond activation. He is a member of the editorial advisory board at Inorganic Chemistry, Chemical Communications, and Angewandte Chemie, among other scientific journals.

Early life and education 
Gilliard is from Hartsville, South Carolina. He attended Hartsville High School, where he was president of the student body. He was an undergraduate student at Clemson University, where he studied chemistry and worked on organometallic transition metal compounds. He moved to the University of Georgia for his doctoral research, where he worked alongside Gregory H. Robinson. His doctoral research considered Group 2 organometallic chemistry. He was a UNCF Merck Fellow at ETH Zurich and Ford Foundation Fellow Case Western Reserve University, and worked on highly reactive phosphorus species.

Research and career 
In 2017, Gilliard joined the faculty at the University of Virginia, where he was promoted to associate professor in 2022. He spent 2021 as a Martin Luther King Jr. Visiting professor at Massachusetts Institute of Technology, and moved there in 2022.

Gilliard investigates molecular systems for energy storage and catalysis. He has investigated smart materials that are responsive to external stimuli, such as light, heat and mechanical force. Gilliard has proposed thermochromic materials that could be used in combat uniforms when soldiers adapt to different temperatures or terrains. The thermochromic materials developed by Gilliard contain thermoluminescent air-stable, colour-tuneable borafluorenium ions.

Gilliard has also investigated polycyclic aromatic hydrocarbons for energy conversion. He introduces main-group atoms into polycyclic aromatic hydrocarbons and investigates the optical and electronic properties. He has shown that the introduction of boron can facilitate modulation of electronic structure or the ability to activate gas molecules such as carbon dioxide. He has demonstrated alkaline earth complexes with redox- and coordination-state flexibility that offer new possibilities for bond activation, and bismuth-containing small molecules for C-H activation.

Awards and honors 
 2020 Chemical & Engineering News Talented 12
 2021 Thieme Chemistry Journals Award
 2021 Negative Emissions Science Scialog Collaborative Innovation Award
 2021 National Science Foundation CAREER Award
 2021 Alfred P. Sloan Research Fellow in Chemistry 
 2021 Organometallics Distinguished Author Award 
 2021 Beckman Young Investigator Award
 2021 Packard Fellowship for Science and Engineering
 2022 University of Virginia Research Excellence Award
 2022 National Organization for the Professional Advancement of Black Chemists and Chemical Engineers Lloyd N. Ferguson Young Scientist Award for Excellence in Research
 2023 American Chemical Society Harry Gray Award for Creative Work in Inorganic Chemistry
 2023 Robert Holland Jr. Award, Research Corporation for Science Advancement

Selected publications

References 

Year of birth missing (living people)
Living people
People from Hartsville, South Carolina
University of Georgia alumni
Clemson University alumni
Massachusetts Institute of Technology faculty
21st-century American chemists
Scientists from South Carolina